Frederick Township is located in Schuyler County, Illinois. As of the 2010 census, its population was 176 and it contained 80 housing units.

Geography

Demographics

References

External links
City-data.com
Illinois State Archives

Townships in Schuyler County, Illinois
Townships in Illinois